Graduation Ridge is a high rock ridge situated north of El Pulgar, forming the northern extremity of the Morozumi Range in Victoria Land, Antarctica. This geographical feature was first mapped by the United States Geological Survey from surveys and U.S. Navy air photos, 1960–63. The ridge was visited by the New Zealand Geological Survey Antarctic Expedition, 1967–68, who gave the name because geologist J.A.S. Dow received his exam results here. The ridge lies situated on the Pennell Coast, a portion of Antarctica lying between Cape Williams and Cape Adare.

References

Ridges of Victoria Land
Pennell Coast